The Tierra Amarilla Historic District is an  historic district which was listed on the National Register of Historic Places in 1986. It includes 107 contributing buildings.

References

National Register of Historic Places in Rio Arriba County, New Mexico
Historic districts on the National Register of Historic Places in New Mexico